Group C of UEFA Euro 2016 contained Germany, Ukraine, Poland and Northern Ireland. Germany was the only former European champion in this group, having won the championship three times (in 1972 and 1980 as West Germany and in 1996 as unified Germany). Matches were played from 12 to 21 June 2016.

Teams

Notes

Standings

In the round of 16,
The winner of Group C, Germany, advanced to play the third-placed team of Group B, Slovakia.
The runner-up of Group C, Poland, advanced to play the runner-up of Group A, Switzerland.
The third-placed team of Group C, Northern Ireland, advanced as one of the four best third-placed teams to play the winner of Group B, Wales.

Matches

Poland vs Northern Ireland

Germany vs Ukraine

Ukraine vs Northern Ireland

Germany vs Poland

Ukraine vs Poland

Northern Ireland vs Germany

References

External links
UEFA Euro 2016 Group C

UEFA Euro 2016
Germany at UEFA Euro 2016
Ukraine at UEFA Euro 2016
Poland at UEFA Euro 2016
Northern Ireland at UEFA Euro 2016